Raffles Design Institute is a for-profit, design-centric educational institution headquartered in Singapore. Its flagship campus (i.e. Raffles Design Institute Singapore) was established in 1990 by the company Raffles Education Corporation Limited.

History
Founded in 1990, Raffles Design Institute is one of the first private institutions in Singapore to offer a Fashion Design course. Within five years, multiple design disciplines including Interactive Media Design, Visual Communication, Product Design, Jewellery Design, Interior Design, Games Design and Animation Design were introduced.

In 2004, Raffles Design Institute received the Singapore Quality Class Award for Private Education Organizations, ensuring that all courses were registered with the appropriate bodies. In 2005, the CaseTrust for Education Award for Private Education Organizations was awarded, which is an indication of approval by The Consumer Association of Singapore Enterprise. In 2008/2009, Edupoll recognized Raffles Design Institute as one of the Top Ten Education Provider [sic] in Singapore and the Largest and Most Global Private Education Provider in Singapore.

In February 2010, Raffles Design Institute, Raffles Merchandising Institute and Raffles School of Business were re-organized as institutes of Raffles College of Higher Education.

Five directors of Raffles Education, including its chairman and CEO, were arrested in February 2022 after investigations by the Monetary Authority of Singapore and the Commercial Affairs Department, on charges related to a loan by Affin Bank. They were released on bail of S$30,000 each.

Controversies, lack of accreditation, and closures

International campuses 
Raffles International College Bangkok, originally known as Raffles Design Institute Bangkok, is a  campus located in the Bangna district of Bangkok, Thailand. It was awarded the title of "Best Design School" for outstanding achievement in the advancement of Arts and Design by Her Royal Highness Princess of Thailand Soamsawali in March 2007. However, in 2010, the school was found to be operating without the permission of the Higher Education Commission of Thailand, and had action taken against it by the Thai authorities. As of November 2017, Raffles had not succeeded in acquiring a valid international college license.

Raffles' partner in its Indian Joint Venture, Educomp Solutions Ltd., was reported to be struggling financially, and divesting from many subsidiaries. This coincided with the closure of many of its colleges in India.

In 2012, the government of Vietnam ordered Raffles to cease operating the campuses in Hanoi and Ho Chi Minh (as Raffles had never obtained a license to provide higher education), and consequently 400 students had to be relocated to its other campuses.

In 2013, Raffles Education Corp signed agreements to establish a university in Negombo (Sri Lanka), and three colleges in Riyadh (Saudi Arabia), Batam and Medan (Indonesia).  However, the proposed university in Negombo Sri Lanka was never built.

In October 2016, Raffles Design Institute shut down its Indian campus in Koramangala, Bungalore without warning, leaving over 160 students stranded with their education. By November 2016, the Raffles schools in Delhi, Bengaluru, Hyderabad and Chennai had been shuttered.

In March 2016, its Australian campus, Raffles College of Design and Commerce, lost TEQSA accreditation. On 26 November 2018, it applied to withdraw registration as an Australian higher education provider and began the process of closing down. Approval to withdraw was granted on 20 December 2018.

Raffles International Institute, its Ulaanbaatar campus (which has been operating since 2005, originally as Hartford Institute) failed to gain government recognition as a university and has never been accredited in Mongolia.

Other controversies 
In 2019, the chairman was taken to court by the second largest shareholder on allegations that the former had renegaded on an agreement to buy back the latter’s shares at a specific price. The court sided with the chairman.

A Malaysian bank filed writs against the company in May 2021 demanding repayment of a loan, amounting to over half the market capitalisation of the company, However, the company disclosed the writs only months later, a breach of the Securities and Futures Act. This resulted in the arrest of five Raffles Education directors, including the chairman, in February 2022.

In October 2021, further corporate governance concerns were raised when an independent auditor found that the company had $196.4 million of current liabilities and current assets of $96.8 million. In response, the company claimed it could continue as a going concern. Despite the shortfall, large sums of money were paid that year to the chairman and various family members. The company was eventually forced to disclose remuneration and benefits paid to every directory of the company and its 81 subsidies.

In April 2022, charges were filed against Raffles Design in India for defamation and attempt to land grab. In June 2022, directors of the company were issued a summons by a Delhi court for alleged "extortion, theft, forgery, as well as 'threats' or 'intimidation'" against a former partner in India.

References

External links 
 

Art schools in Singapore
Fashion schools in Asia
Educational institutions established in 1990
1990 establishments in Singapore
Singaporean fashion